In theoretical physics, there are many theories with supersymmetry (SUSY) which also have internal gauge symmetries. Supersymmetric gauge theory generalizes this notion.

Gauge theory

A gauge theory is a mathematical framework for analysing gauge symmetries. There are two types of symmetries, viz., global and local. A global symmetry is the symmetry which remains invariant at each point of a manifold (manifold can be either of spacetime coordinates or that of internal quantum numbers). A local symmetry is the symmetry which depends upon the space over which it is defined, and changes with the variation in coordinates. Thus, such symmetry is invariant only locally (i.e., in a neighborhood on the manifold).

Quantum chromodynamics and quantum electrodynamics are famous examples of gauge theories.

Supersymmetry

In particle physics, there exist particles with two kinds of particle statistics, bosons and fermions. Bosons carry integer spin values, and are characterized by the ability to have any number of identical bosons occupy a single point in space. They are thus identified with forces. Fermions carry half-integer spin values, and by the Pauli exclusion principle, identical fermions cannot occupy a single position in spacetime. They are identified with matter. Thus, SUSY is considered a strong candidate for the unification of radiation (boson-mediated forces) and matter.

This mechanism works via an operator , known as supersymmetry generator, which acts as follows:

 

For instance, the supersymmetry generator can take a photon as an argument and transform it into a photino and vice versa. This happens through translation in the (parameter) space.

SUSY gauge theory

The motivation for a supersymmetric version of gauge theory can be the fact that gauge invariance is consistent with supersymmetry.
The first examples were discovered by Bruno Zumino and Sergio Ferrara, and independently by Abdus Salam and James Strathdee in 1974.

Because both the half-integer spin fermions and the integer spin bosons can become gauge particles. Moreover the vector fields and the spinor fields both reside in the same representation of the internal symmetry group.

The main problem in construction of SUSY Gauge Theory is to extend the above transformation in a way that is consistent with SUSY transformations.

The Wess–Zumino gauge provides a successful solution to this problem. Once such suitable gauge is obtained, the dynamics of the SUSY gauge theory work as follows: we seek a lagrangian that is invariant under the Super-gauge transformations (these transformations are an important tool needed to develop supersymmetric version of a gauge theory). Then we can integrate the lagrangian using the Berezin integration rules and thus obtain the action. Which further leads to the equations of motion and hence can provide a complete analysis of the dynamics of the theory.

SUSY in 4D (with 4 real generators)
In four dimensions, the minimal  supersymmetry may be written using a superspace. This superspace involves four extra fermionic coordinates , transforming as a two-component spinor and its conjugate.

Every superfield, i.e. a field that depends on all coordinates of the superspace, may be expanded with respect to the new fermionic coordinates. There exists a special kind of superfields, the so-called chiral superfields, that only depend on the variables  but not their conjugates (more precisely). However, a vector superfield depends on all coordinates. It describes a gauge field and its superpartner, namely a Weyl fermion that obeys a Dirac equation.

 is the vector superfield (prepotential) and is real. The fields on the right hand side are component fields.

The gauge transformations act as

where  is any chiral superfield.

It's easy to check that the chiral superfield

is gauge invariant. So is its complex conjugate .

A non-supersymmetric covariant gauge which is often used is the Wess–Zumino gauge. The residual gauge symmetries are gauge transformations of the traditional bosonic type.

A chiral superfield  with a charge of  transforms as

Therefore  is gauge invariant. Here  is called a bridge since it "bridges" a field which transforms under  only with a field which transforms under  only.

More generally, if we have a real gauge group  that we wish to supersymmetrize, we first have to complexify it to  then acts a compensator for the complex gauge transformations in effect absorbing them leaving only the real parts. This is what's being done in the Wess–Zumino gauge.

Differential superforms
Let's rephrase everything to look more like a conventional Yang–Mills gauge theory. Integrability conditions for chiral superfields with the chiral constraint

leave us with

This means that we can either gauge fix  or  but not both simultaneously. Call the two different gauge fixing schemes I and II respectively. In gauge I,  and in gauge II, . Now, the trick is to use two different gauges simultaneously; gauge I for chiral superfields and gauge II for antichiral superfields. In order to bridge between the two different gauges, we need a gauge transformation. Call it  (by convention). If we were using one gauge for all fields,  would be gauge invariant.

In gauge I, we still have the residual gauge  where  and in gauge II, we have the residual gauge  satisfying . Under the residual gauges, the bridge transforms as

Without any additional constraints, the bridge  wouldn't give all the information about the gauge field. However, with the additional constraint , there's only one unique gauge field which is compatible with the bridge modulo gauge transformations. Now, the bridge gives exactly the same information content as the gauge field.

Theories with 8 or more SUSY generators 
In theories with higher supersymmetry (and perhaps higher dimension), a vector superfield typically describes not only a gauge field and a Weyl fermion but also at least one complex scalar field.

See also
 super QCD
 superpotential
 D-term
 F-term
 current superfield
 Minimal Supersymmetric Standard Model
 Supersymmetric quantum mechanics

References
 Stephen P. Martin. A Supersymmetry Primer, .
 Prakash, Nirmala. Mathematical Perspective on Theoretical Physics: A Journey from Black Holes to Superstrings, World Scientific (2003).

Supersymmetric quantum field theory
Gauge theories